Judit Mascó i Palau (born 12 October 1969) is a Spanish model, television host and writer from Barcelona.

Biography

Modeling

Early career
Mascó grew up in a middle class family, daughter of a headmaster. At age 15, she started her career in the fashion world, while taking piano lessons and attending school. Her breakthrough was at age 13 in a television commercial. She began her studies as a model at the Francina International Modeling Agency's School. She was later signed to the agency and began modeling for print. Her modeling pursuits led her to Japan and Italy mainly.

International career
Mascó appeared in the 1990 Sports Illustrated Swimsuit Issue as the cover model. She also appeared in the 1991, 1992, 1994, and 1995 editions. This cover launched her worldwide and was quickly hired for various high-profile advertising campaigns, including Max Mara, Laurèl by Escada, Armand Bassi, Betty Barclay, Georges Rech, Mango, Majestic and Palmers Lingerie. She kept been the face of a variety of advertising campaigns including Natura Bissé, El Corte Inglés, Clairol, Lancaster, Trident, Fila, Clarins or Timotei. Mascó is also the only Spanish model (and with Penélope Cruz and Rosalía the only Spaniard woman) who has graced on the cover of US Vogue. She has been featured in fashion spreads in most major fashion magazines including covers like French, Canadian, American, Spanish, Swedish and Italian Elle, Harper's Bazaar, Cleo, Woman, Glamour, Marie Claire, Sposabella, Telva, Ocean Drive, New Woman or Amica.

Mascó has worked with the most well-known photographers in the fashion industry in the 1990s, such as Hans Feurer, Gilles Bensimon, Ellen Von Unwerth, Bruce Weber, Oliviero Toscani, Steven Meisel, Fabrizio Ferri, Albert Watson or Patrick Demarchelier among others.
As a catwalk model she appeared in shows for major designers as Armani, Dolce & Gabbana, Valentino, Max Mara, Carolina Herrera, Escada, Sportmax, Byblos, Loewe or Anne Klein.

Modeling after 30

Mascó is regarded as one of the best Spanish models of the 1990s and still appears in print occasionally. She became the exclusive spokesmodel for the cosmetics brand Natura Bissé from 2004 until 2008. At the time she worked for Swarovski among others. In 2009 she signed for Olay.

Acting career
She played  supporting roles in Después del sueño (After the Dream) and El largo invierno (The Long Winter of '39), two Spanish films from the early 1990s and was asked to become a Bond girl and to star in A Walk in the Clouds (1995), although due to her busy schedule in fashion she turned down those offers.

Television career
Mascó's television career began collaborating in the fashion section of TV shows. She made several appearances in Spanish TV series as herself.
In 2006 and 2007, she hosted the reality television show Supermodelo in Cuatro TV.
She left the show the one season before it was canceled in 2008. That year she hosted the show "Els 25" (The 25) in TV3 (Catalonia).
Currently, Masco can be seen on television as the hostess of La 2's TV show Actívate.

Awards
Mascó received the prestigious Elle Woman of the Year Award in 2003 and the Protagonistas Award in 2009 for her activism.

Activism
Outside of TV, modeling, and writing, Mascó is involved in social change efforts. She is a board member of several international nongovernmental organizations such as the Vicente Ferrer Foundation, the Asociación de Donantes de Riñón Españoles (Association of Spanish Kidney Donors), Amics de la Gent Gran(Friends of the Elderly) and the Caravana Solidaria al África Occidental (West Africa Solidarity Caravan). In addition she is the president of the Festival of Childhood and Youth, held in Barcelona and advisory board member of Oxfam Spain.
In 2000 she traveled to Florida to meet with Spanish citizen Joaquin José Martínez, at the time imprisoned in the death row, to alert the media of an unfair  death sentence for two murders he did not commit. Her visit was due to a campaign of pressure from Spain. All the media coverage helped the conviction mistrial by the  Florida Supreme Court that accepted to achieve the retrial of Martínez in which he was acquitted of all charges.

Writing
Mascó has written two books. In 2003, her self-described memoir, El Libro de Judit Mascó (Judit Mascó's book), was published. In 2009, she released her second book, Modelo (Model) in which she describes her job as a model and intends to guide young girls into this world.

Personal life
She is married to lawyer Eduardo Vicente, who was a high school classmate of her brother. They have four daughters, one of them an adopted girl from Haiti.

External links

 Official website
 

People from Barcelona
1969 births
Living people
Spanish female models
People from Catalonia